The Museum of Northern Arizona is a museum in Flagstaff, Arizona, United States. The Museum was established as a repository for Indigenous material and natural history specimens from the Colorado Plateau.

The museum was founded in 1928 by zoologist Dr. Harold S. Colton and artist Mary-Russell Ferrell Colton from Philadelphia, Pennsylvania, and is dedicated to preserving the history and cultures of northern Arizona and the Colorado Plateau.

The museum is a member of the North American Reciprocal Museums program.

Hours of Operation:Monday–Saturday: 10:00 am–5:00 pmSunday: 12:00–5:00 pm

History
"Someone ought to tell the world about it," wrote Harold Sellers Colton and Frank E. Baxter in a 1932 guide for the northern Arizona traveler. They eloquently described the wonders of the vast region—colors to delight the artist, Native American peoples to engage the anthropologist, traces of human occupation to occupy the archaeologist, an open textbook for the geologist, plants and wildlife to intrigue the biologist and botanist—in short, an area abundant with treasures to delight both scientist and visitor. The authors were reiterating what had already been stated—northern Arizona and the Colorado Plateau were definitely worth exploring.

Northern Arizona sits on the part of the Colorado Plateau, which extends over parts of four western states: Arizona, Utah, Colorado, and New Mexico. The section in northern Arizona features the towering volcano known as the San Francisco Peaks, the ever-changing palette of the Painted Desert, the unequaled Grand Canyon, beautiful Lake Powell, curious Petrified Forest, lush Oak Creek Canyon, bountiful Verde Valley, and the verdant White Mountains, just to name a few high-lights. Living amongst these physical marvels are the native peoples who, in the course of maintaining their cultural traditions, acknowledge and celebrate the natural wonders surrounding them. Elevations extend three miles vertically—from the 12,637-foot-high Humphrey's Peak of the San Francisco Peaks to the one-mile-deep Grand Canyon. In between are nearly limitless examples of the Earth's natural history, brought close together in an area that provides an unending laboratory for the inquisitive.

Into this land came Harold Sellers and Mary-Russell Ferrell Colton and their family. Dr. Colton was a zoology professor at the University of Pennsylvania whose zest for knowledge went far beyond that field and who would be forever excited by the many research opportunities in northern Arizona. Mrs. Colton was equally intrigued by the native peoples and scenic grandeur of the region, and she spent many hours sketching and painting them. After numerous visits to the region, they moved to Flagstaff in 1926 to pursue their mutual and individual interests.

The Coltons became involved in efforts to create a local museum that would display the natural and human wonders of the area. Combining their skill and benevolence, and in response to the urging of prominent citizens of both Flagstaff and Tucson, they helped the community found the Museum of Northern Arizona (MNA) in 1928. The Museum is a regionally based institution that researches, collects, and exhibits all that represents northern Arizona and the Colorado Plateau. Dr. Colton became MNA Director and Mrs. Colton the Curator of Art and Ethnology, allowing them to follow and explore their respective interests in science and art and making MNA the spirited, multifaceted institution we enjoy today. With its unique blend of science and art, MNA stands alone. At MNA, research and public exhibits intertwine with collections to present a rich, composite view of northern Arizona and the Colorado Plateau.

In 1930, they hired Katharine Bartlett, a physical anthropologist from Denver, to curate the museum. Bartlett spent the next 51 years organizing first the museum and then the library. Her cataloging procedures became the foundation of the research facility the museum has become.
The Museum of Northern Arizona offers its visitors many opportunities to become familiar with the area through public exhibits and programs. At the same time, its staff and researchers continue their studies because science, like life, is not static—it is ever-evolving. MNA continually explores ways to preserve this distinctive region and ensure that its uniqueness endures.

MNA's three components—public programs, research, and collections—complement one another in a continual circle. Scientists study the data, utilize the collections, and develop public exhibits designed to introduce the Colorado Plateau. Museum visitors, after this introduction, often seek further knowledge, stimulating the scientists to reconsider the data and to reexamine the collections. This ongoing cycle is considered optimal for a museum, as each component is dependent upon the other. MNA is a private, nonprofit organization supported by its members and by supplemental funding. Its exhibit areas have grown from two rooms in the Flagstaff Woman's Club in 1928 to today's 24,700-square-foot Exhibits building that hosted over 91,000 visitors in 1996. On an adjacent part of the campus are its research and collections facilities.

The Ethnology Gallery within this organization demonstrates the evolution and distinct characteristics of such tribes as the Hopi, Zuni, Navajo, and Pai.

Flagstaff and The Establishment of MNA

"A happy accident...would take me...to and through Arizona..." said forester Bernhard E. Fernow in 1897, writing about his trip with biologist C. Hart Merriam to explore Arizona. Fernow told the National Geographic Society about his delight at the unique environs of Arizona and desire to return as often as possible. He was not alone in this thinking as heightened awareness of the area brought more and more researchers. Scientific study of northern Arizona had begun in the 1850s with government-sponsored road and railway surveyors who preceded the settlers. The surveyors' reports to Washington, D.C., describing the natural wonders of the Flagstaff area and the Colorado Plateau, prompted other scientists to explore the area.

Construction of the transcontinental roads and railroads brought the first settlers to Flagstaff in the 1870s. Laborers, shopkeepers, and saloon owners liked its scenic location at the base of the San Francisco Peaks, which offered a permanent water supply. The town's remoteness caused less-than-desirable residents to appear, providing Flagstaff with its share of rough-and-rowdy early days. Additional settlers moved in and earned a living from the natural resources of the area, including timber and grazing land.

By the time of the Coltons' arrival in 1926, the 4,000 Flagstaff residents were encouraging the newly arrived educators, scientists, and artists to help steer their town away from its wild-west beginnings. In Flagstaff, the Coltons sought avenues to pursue their respective interests of science and art. Both believed that they should help others and use their time and money for the accomplishment of lasting contributions. In Flagstaff, they saw propitious opportunities for all of their interests.

Dr. Colton made an immediate connection in Flagstaff scientific circles during the first summer they camped in Flagstaff, due to a letter of introduction from Professor Edward S. Morse, a personal friend of both Dr. Colton and Percival Lowell, to Dr. V.M. Slipher of Lowell Observatory. The Observatory, founded in Flagstaff in 1894 by Percival Lowell and the site of pioneering astronomical work, is located in Flagstaff specifically for the clear dark skies that present opportunities for unclouded space study.

Northern Arizona Normal School, later Arizona State Teachers College and still later Northern Arizona University, opened in the fall of 1899 with classes for those preparing to be teachers. Its Faculty contained a few scientists and artists Beginning in 1929 with Lyndon Hargrave, MNA anthropology staff donated their time to teach classes at the college, with Dr. Colton underwriting the costs. This continued until the 1950s, when NAU finally supported an anthropology faculty.

Henry H. Robinson arrived in Flagstaff from Yale University in 1901 for a summer's work of graduate studies on the San Francisco Peaks volcanic field. He returned for the following two summers to complete his dissertation on the geology of the Peaks. His work followed, by nearly half a century, the establishment of the U.S Geological Survey, which still maintains a facility in Flagstaff.

The youthful U.S. Forest Service established the nation's first forest research experiment station in nearby Fort Valley at the request of Flagstaff lumbermen T.A. and M.J. Riordan, who sought the answers to why the Ponderosa pine trees, once so profuse, were not regenerating after logging. Station Director Gustaf A. Pearson began studies into this problem in August, 1908. He served as an ex-officio MNA Trustee until his retirement in 1945 and today has a building at the Research Center named after him.

Pearson also helped Dr. Colton and former Lowell employee Andrew E. Douglass to pioneer studies in tree-ring dating. Pearson provided Douglass with tree-boring equipment, which Douglass used to perfect the science of determining the age of trees based on their growth (Dendrochronology), greatly aiding researchers in dating archaeological sites. Douglass experimented with trees on MNA property, and the first tree-ring conference was held in 1934 under pines near the Colton House.

Perhaps the most visible scientific presence in northern Arizona contributing to the evolution of MNA was that of the geologists and archaeologists who arrived in Flagstaff via the train in early summer, where they purchased supplies that were taken to remote sites located out on the Plateau. Then, in late summer, the bearded, sandy, and windblown scientists returned with boxes and crates filled with materials removed from the sites. Flagstaff residents watched with resentment as "their" artifacts disappeared when the men boarded the trains to return to eastern museums with their finds. Thus began the desire for a local place where regional materials could be housed, studied, and displayed.

References

External links

 
 

Natural history museums in Arizona
Art museums and galleries in Arizona
Native American museums in Arizona
Museums in Flagstaff, Arizona
Museums established in 1928
1928 establishments in Arizona
Paleontology in Arizona